was the forty-fourth of the sixty-nine stations of the Nakasendō connecting Edo with Kyoto in Edo period Japan. It is located in former Mino Province in what is now part of the city of Nakatsugawa, Gifu Prefecture, Japan.

History
Ochiai-juku is separated from Magome-juku to the east by the Jikkoku Pass, which marked the informal border of the "Kiso Kaido" portion of the Nakasendō highway In the early Edo period, the system of post stations on the Nakasendō was formalized by the Tokugawa shogunate in 1602, and it became a stopping place for traveling merchants and it was also on the sankin-kōtai route used by various western daimyō to-and-from the Shogun's court in Edo. 

The post station was located within Owari Domain, and was 331.2 kilometers from Edo.

The post station remains very well preserved, and unusually, both the honjin and waki-honjin have survived.

Ochiai-juku in The Sixty-nine Stations of the Kiso Kaidō
Utagawa Hiroshige's ukiyo-e print of Ochiai-juku dates from 1835 -1838. The print depicts a daimyō procession departing Ochiai-juku across a rustic bridge. The daimyō is riding in a  closed kago (palanquin), with a long straggling line of retainers in front and in back, some of whom are carrying his luggage. In the background is the post station, behind which are the high peaks of the Ena Mountains, indicating that the procession is heading towards home in the west.

Neighboring post towns
Nakasendō
Magome-juku - Ochiai-juku - Nakatsugawa-juku

References

External links

Hiroshige Kiso-Kaido series
Ochiai-juku on Kiso Kaido Road
Gifu Nakasendo Guide

Notes

Stations of the Nakasendō
Post stations in Gifu Prefecture
Nakatsugawa, Gifu
Mino Province